Syedna Yusuf Najmuddin bin Sulaiman (died on 23 June 1567 CE or 16 Dhu al-Hijjah 974 AH, Taiba, Yemen) was the 24th Da'i al-Mutlaq (Absolute Missionary) of the Taiyabi Ismailis.  He succeeded Mohammad Ezzuddin to the religious post.

Family
He hailed from a large family, comprising seven brothers and one sister named Fatema Baisaheb. His father's name was Sulaiman while his mother's name was Noor Bibisaheba.

Life
Yusuf Najmuddin's native city was Sidhpur, Gujarat, India. He was one of many bright students who went to Yemen, to study Islamic education. The 23rd Da'i, Muhammad Izzudin, personally began to educate him. When his learning was complete, Syedna Yusuf returned to India. In the year 1536, Muhammad Izzudin gave his nass to Yusuf Najmuddin when he was in Sidhpur. For five years he stayed at Sidhpur, built a mosque and twenty-four shops for the community to establish. 

After this, he decided to travel to Yemen, where enemies had captured many fortresses belonging to the Dawah in the era of Arwain Pasha, who was the governor of the region under Ottoman Turks. Syedna Yusuf recaptured most of the forts that belonged to previous dais. Books and other theological and literary works of the era of previous Dais were transferred to India.

Burial
His tenure as da'i was for 28 years, 9 months and 23 days. His grave is located at Taiba in Yemen. It was identified by 52nd Dai Syedna Mohammed Burhanuddin during his first visit to Yemen in 1961.

Succession
Syedna Yusuf Najmuddin gave nass or succession to Jalal Shamshuddin bin Hasan of Ahmedabad as his successor, the 25th Da'i.

Gallery

References

Further reading
Daftary, Farhad, The Ismaili, Their History and Doctrine(Chapter -Mustalian Ismailism- p. 300-310)
Lathan, Young, Religion, Learning and Science
Bacharach, Joseph W. Meri, Medieval Islamic Civilisation

Tayyibi da'is
Dawoodi Bohra da'is
1567 deaths
Year of birth unknown
16th-century Arabs
16th-century Ismailis
16th-century Islamic religious leaders